USS LST-554 was a United States Navy  in commission from 1944 to 1946.

Construction and commissioning
LST-554 was laid down on 30 January 1944 at Evansville, Indiana, by the Missouri Valley Bridge and Iron Company. She was launched on 18 March 1944, sponsored by Mrs. T. R. Davis, and commissioned on 27 April 1944.

Service history
During World War II, LST-554 was assigned to the Pacific Theater of Operations.  She participated in the capture and occupation of the southern Palau Islands in September and October 1944.  She then took part in the Philippines campaign, participating in the Leyte landings in October and November 1944 and the Lingayen Gulf landings in January 1945. She then participated in the assault on and occupation of Okinawa Gunto in April 1945.

Following the war, LST-554 returned to the United States.

Decommissioning and disposal
LST-554 was decommissioned on 20 July 1946 and stricken from the Navy List on 25 September 1946. On 29 March 1948, she was sold to Kaiser Shipyards, of Vancouver, Washington, for scrapping.

Honors and awards

LST-554 earned four battle stars for her World War II service.

References

NavSource Online: Amphibious Photo Archive LST-554

LST-542-class tank landing ships
World War II amphibious warfare vessels of the United States
Ships built in Evansville, Indiana
1944 ships